"Synthicide" is a song performed by the short lived American synthpop group SSQ, from their only studio album Playback. The song reached #47 on the U.S. Dance chart.

In popular culture 
The song appears in the 1984 comedy film, Hardbodies.
The song also appears in the 1985 film, Cavegirl.

References 

1983 songs
1983 debut singles
American new wave songs